Basic is a 1984 instrumental collaboration album by guitarist Robert Quine and drummer Fred Maher. It was called Basic as it is just basic tracks with no solos.

Track listing

Personnel 
Greg Calbi – mastering
Fred Maher – guitar, bass guitar, drum machine, production
Robert Quine – guitar, bass guitar, drum machine, production
Marcia Resnick – photography, design
Mario Salvati – mixing

References

External links 
 

1984 debut albums
E.G. Records albums
Robert Quine albums
Albums produced by Fred Maher
Fred Maher albums
Instrumental rock albums
Collaborative albums